Melaleuca condylosa is a plant in the myrtle family, Myrtaceae and is endemic to the south-west of Western Australia. It is similar to Melaleuca brophyi except that its fruiting clusters are often knobbly and the flower heads and leaves are slightly larger.

Description

The flowers are in heads at the ends of branches which continue to grow after flowering. Each head is composed of 6 to 11 groups of flowers with three flowers in each group. There are five bundles of stamens around the flower, each with 5 to 7 pale yellow stamens giving the flower its colour.

Taxonomy and naming
Melaleuca condylosa was first formally described in 1999 by Lyndley Craven from a specimen found " east along Bendering Reserve Road from the Bendering wheat bin". The specific epithet (condylosa) is from the Greek kondylos meaning "knob" or "prominence", referring to the knobbly fruit.

Distribution and habitat
This melaleuca occurs in the Narembeen, Kondinin and Hyden districts in the Avon Wheatbelt, Coolgardie and Mallee biogeographic regions. It grows in melaleuca-mallee shrubland in sandy loam on undulating sandplains and slopes.

Conservation status
Melaleuca condylosa is listed as "not threatened" by the Government of Western Australia Department of Parks and Wildlife.

References

condylosa
Plants described in 1999
Endemic flora of Western Australia
Taxa named by Lyndley Craven